Juan Carlos Zarate is an American attorney and security advisor who served as the deputy national security advisor for combating terrorism during the George W. Bush administration. He is the chairman and co-founder of the Financial Integrity Network, a Washington, D.C.-based consulting firm, and as senior adviser at the Center for Strategic and International Studies.

In his previous role, Zarate worked on the Bush administration's counterterrorism strategy.

Early life and education
The son of a Mexican father and Cuban mother, Zarate was born and raised in Santa Ana, California and graduated from Mater Dei High School. Zarate graduated from Harvard University and Harvard Law School. He studied as a Rotary International Fellow at the Universidad de Salamanca, Spain.

Zarate wrote his thesis on the effects of U.S. foreign policy on democracy in Latin America. In law school, he focused on international law and security issues and wrote his third-year paper on the use of private military contractors in war.

Career
Prior to joining the NSC, Zarate served as the Assistant Secretary for Terrorist Financing and Financial Crimes where he led Treasury's domestic and international efforts to disrupt terrorist financing, built comprehensive anti-money laundering systems, and expanded the use of Treasury powers to advance national security interests. He led the U.S. government's global efforts to seize Saddam Hussein's assets, resulting in the return of over $3 billion of Iraqi assets from the U.S. and around the world.

Prior to working at the Department of the Treasury, Zarate served as a prosecutor in the Department of Justice’s Terrorism and Violent Crime Section, where he worked on the  investigation.

In June 2014, he accepted an appointment to the Board that oversees the Vatican's Institute for the Works of Religion ("IOR"), a move announced by Cardinal Pell of the Vatican Finance Ministry as part of Pope Francis I's efforts to clean up the finances of the Vatican. Zarate currently sits on the advisory board for nonprofit America Abroad Media.

Publications
Zarate is the author of two books: Forging Democracy, a book on the impact of U.S. foreign policy on democratization in Central America, and Treasury's War: The Unleashing Of A New Era Of Financial Warfare, about the use of financial power to counter terrorism.

References

External links
 

Living people
Harvard Law School alumni
American people of Basque descent
American politicians of Cuban descent
American politicians of Mexican descent
University of Salamanca alumni
People from Santa Ana, California
United States Department of Justice officials
George W. Bush administration personnel
Terrorism in the United States
Year of birth missing (living people)
CBS News people
Latino conservatism in the United States